Ewt or EWT may refer to:

Non-profit organisations
 Endangered Wildlife Trust, South Africa
 Essex Wildlife Trust, England

Other uses
 Eastern War Time, a defunct U.S. time zone
 Electroweak theory, in particle physics
 Newt (ewt in Middle English), an animal